Dawen River or River Dawenhe is a river in Shandong Province, China. 
The main branch of the river originates from Yiyuan, flows through Xintai, Laiwu, and merges with Chaiwen River at Dawenkou (it literally translates into river mouth of Dawen) . 
The merged river is also known as Mouwen River  which flows through Tai'an, Feicheng, empties into Dongping Lake which enters Yellow River. 
The section of the river from Dongping onwards is also known as Daqing River .

In ancient times, this river was called the 'Wen', and it was the border between the State of Lu and the State of Qi.

See also
List of rivers in China

References 

Rivers of Shandong